Boughton Green, part of the village of Boughton Monchelsea, is in Kent, England. it lies to the NE of the village centre. The population is included in the civil parish of Loose.

Villages in Kent